Chris Eubank Jr. vs Conor Benn, billed as "Born Rivals", is a cancelled professional boxing match contested between former IBO super-middleweight and WBA interim middleweight champion, Chris Eubank Jr., and WBA Continental welterweight champion, Conor Benn. Originally scheduled to take place on 8 October 2022 at The O2 Arena in London,  the bout was postponed after Benn tested positive for a banned substance.

Background
Rumours of a fight between Eubank and Benn surfaced in July 2022. It was confirmed in August that the pair would fight on 8 October at The O2 Arena in London, England. At a catch weight of 11 st 2 bls (157 lbs), the event will be streamed live on DAZN worldwide and on pay-per-view in the UK and Ireland. It has been billed as "Born Rivals" based on the rivalry between the pair's fathers in the 1990s.

The British Boxing Board of Control released a statement on 5 October declaring the fight is prohibited from taking place after Benn tested positive for clomifene. Benn's promoters, Matchroom Sport, released a statement saying, "Benn has not been charged with any rule violation, he is not suspended, and he remains free to fight." Eubanks' promoter also said the fight will go ahead as scheduled. The following day both promoters announced the fight was postponed.

References

2022 in boxing
2022 in British sport
2022 sports events in London
Boxing in London
Cancelled boxing matches